"Your Surrender" is the third single from American rock band Neon Trees' debut album Habits. It was written by S*A*M, Sluggo, Tyler Glenn and produced by Tim Pagnotta. It was released on February 22, 2011. The song peaked at number 27 on the Billboard Alternative Songs chart and number 50 on the Billboard Rock Songs chart. A remix version of "Your Surrender" by JD Walker was featured in the Disney film Prom and its soundtrack.

Music videos

Neon Trees version
A music video to accompany the release of "Your Surrender" was first released onto YouTube on 15 July 2011 at a total length of three minutes and thirty-nine seconds.

Prom version
Another video titled Prom version was released on April 6, 2011 and directed by Paul "Coy" Allen. The video features the cast of Disney's Prom (Aimee Teegarden, Thomas McDonell, Janelle Ortiz and Nicholas Braun) alongside the band.

Track listing

Credits and personnel
Lead vocals – Neon Trees
Producers – Tim Pagnotta
Lyrics – S*A*M, Sluggo, Tyler Glenn
Label: Mercury Records

Chart performance

References

2011 singles
Neon Trees songs
Songs written by Sam Hollander
Songs written by Dave Katz
Songs written by Tyler Glenn
Mercury Records singles
Songs about proms